A tie-breaker was required in Major League Baseball (MLB) when two or more teams were tied at the end of the regular season for a postseason position such as a league pennant (prior to the introduction of the League Championship Series in 1969), a division title, or a wild card spot. As these tie-breaker games counted as part of the regular season and MLB teams (American League beginning in 1961, and National League beginning in 1962) have 162-game regular season schedules, the tie-breaker games were sometimes referred to as "Game 163". In 2022, as part of the new Collective Bargaining Agreement to end the 2021–22 Major League Baseball lockout, tiebreaker games were replaced with statistical tiebreakers.

Sixteen  – 12 single-game and four series – have been played in MLB history. In baseball statistics,  games counted as regular season games with all events in them counted towards regular season statistics. This had implications on statistical races, such as when Matt Holliday won the batting average and runs batted in titles thanks in part to his performance in the 2007 .

In 2007, for example, the Philadelphia Phillies, New York Mets, San Diego Padres, Colorado Rockies, and Arizona Diamondbacks finished the season within two games of one another. The possibility existed for as many as four teams to be locked in a series of  that year to decide the NL East, West, and Wild Card. Similarly, late in the 2012 season the possibility existed for the New York Yankees, Baltimore Orioles, and either the Texas Rangers or Oakland Athletics to all finish with the same record. This could have required the teams to play a complex set of multiple games to determine divisional and wild card winners, a situation which Jayson Stark described as potentially "baseball's worst scheduling nightmare."

History
The first , held in 1946, decided the winner of the NL pennant between the St. Louis Cardinals and the Brooklyn Dodgers, who had finished the season tied at 96–58. The Cardinals won the series in two games and went on to win the 1946 World Series, one of four  winners who have gone on to win the World Series.  Three  games have gone into extra innings: the decisive second game of the 1959 series, the 2007 Wild Card , and the 2009 game. The 2008 , a 1–0 victory for the White Sox, was the lowest scoring game, while the 2007 match-up with 17 total runs was the highest scoring. The Dodgers franchise has participated in six , twice while the team was based in Brooklyn and four times in Los Angeles, the most for any team. Dodger Stadium, Ebbets Field, Fenway Park, the Polo Grounds and Wrigley Field are the only venues which have hosted multiple  games. Both games at the Polo Grounds came in the 1951 series.

One of the most famous moments in MLB history came in the final game of the 1951 National League  series. Entering the bottom of the ninth inning the New York Giants were trailing the Dodgers 4–1. Al Dark and Don Mueller each singled to put runners on first and third base. Whitey Lockman hit a double, scoring Dark to make the game 4–2. Finally, Bobby Thomson hit a walk-off home run which has come to be known as the "Shot Heard 'Round the World" to give the Giants the 5–4 victory and the National League pennant. ESPN's SportsCentury ranked it as the second greatest game of the 20th century. In 1962, the first season of the NL expanded schedule to 162 games, the only 3 game tie breaker in the 162 game season took place between the San Francisco Giants and Los Angeles Dodgers with the Giants winning 2–1. This was the longest regular season schedule ever played by 2 teams at 165 games, a record that will almost certainly never be matched. The 2000s saw three years of consecutive one-run tiebreaker games. The Rockies stormed back from a 2-run deficit in the 13th in 2007, winning 9–8 in a surprising run to the World Series that year. In 2008, a Jim Thome home run and a stellar performance by John Danks helped the White Sox edge out the Twins 1–0. The Twins ended up on the winning side the following year, tying the game in the 10th after going down a run and then walking off in the 12th inning to defeat the Tigers 6–5.

In 2018, two tiebreakers were played to conclude the season for the first time in MLB history. The NL West was decided between the Los Angeles Dodgers and the Colorado Rockies, while the NL Central was decided between the Milwaukee Brewers and the Chicago Cubs. The Dodgers and Brewers, the winners of these games, advanced to the NLDS, while the losers played each other in the Wild Card game. 

Despite one team playing on their home field, tie-breakers have not favored the home team statistically, with the home team having gone 11–11 since the first tie-breaker game was played.

Starting with the 2022 season, as part of the new Collective Bargaining Agreement to end the 2021–22 Major League Baseball lockout, the MLB added a third wild card team in each league, expanding the playoffs to 12 teams, and tiebreaker game format was abolished. Ties will only be broken statistically.

Key

Tie-breakers

Win–loss records by team

 In cases where a series was played, win–loss total reflects outcome of the series, not individual games.

Team choices on tiebreaker designations
A tiebreaker involving three teams or more would have involved a more complex series of match-ups to determine what team(s) earned what playoff berth(s). This scenario never actually occurred but, on a few occasions, it was close enough that the teams involved selected tiebreaker designation in anticipation of such a scenario.

Three-way tie for one wild card spot
While such a tie had never occurred, teams within range were requested to choose between designations A, B, and C in case. Team A hosted Team B. The winner would then host Team C, with the winner of that game getting the wild card spot.

Three-way tie for two wild card spots
While such a tie had never occurred, teams within range were requested to choose between designations A, B, and C in case. Team A hosted Team B, with the winner awarded one spot. Team C would host the loser of the first game, with the winner getting the other spot.

Four-way tie for two wild card spots

While such a tie had never occurred, teams within range were requested to choose between designations A, B, C, and D in case. Team A hosted Team B. Team C hosted Team D. The winners of each game would've been awarded a wild-card spot.

References

General

Specific

Tie